Maize stripe tenuivirus (MSpV) is a pathogenic plant virus.

External links
ICTVdB - The Universal Virus Database: Maize stripe virus
Family Groups - The Baltimore Method

Viral plant pathogens and diseases
Tenuiviruses